Gregorio Isidro Torres Ramírez (born 3 September 1985) is a Mexican former professional footballer who played as a midfielder.

Career
Torres began his playing career in 2005 with the team Coyotes de Sonora in the Primera Division A. He signed with Atlas later in the year, and made his professional debut on April 8, 2006, in a 3–3 tie between the Zorros and Santos Laguna, the team Torres is currently playing for. He scored his first professional goal on November 4, 2006. It was the game winner, as Torres came off the bench to score in the 79th minute. Atlas beat Necaxa, 2–1.

"Goyo", as he is nicknamed, was traded to Cruz Azul in 2007, but failed to garnish enough playing time. After returning to Atlas and not playing a single game, he was traded to Santos in 2008. He has seen plenty of action in the CONCACAF Champions League for Santos, playing in 6 games and scoring 2 goals against C.S.D. Municipal and Tauro FC.

He played with the Jaguares de Jalisco of the Liga de Balompié Mexicano, leading them to a runner-up finish in the 2021 season.

References

External links
 

1985 births
Living people
Liga MX players
Santos Laguna footballers
Cruz Azul footballers
Atlas F.C. footballers
C.F. Pachuca players
Club León footballers
Association football midfielders
Footballers from Guadalajara, Jalisco
Mexican footballers
Correcaminos UAT footballers
Venados F.C. players
Real Estelí F.C. players
Mexican expatriate footballers
Expatriate footballers in Nicaragua
Mexican expatriate sportspeople in Nicaragua
Liga de Balompié Mexicano players